Thatcham Reed Beds is a  biological Site of Special Scientific Interest east of Newbury in Berkshire.

Thatcham Reed Beds is important nationally for its extensive reed bed, species-rich alder woodland and fen habitats. The latter supports Desmoulin's whorl snail (Vertigo moulinsiana), which is of national and European importance. A large assemblage of breeding birds including nationally rare species such as Cetti's warbler (Cettia cetti) is also associated with the reedbed, fen and open water habitats found at Thatcham Reed Beds.

Thatcham's network of gravel pits, reedbed, woodland, hedges, and grassland is rich in wildlife and has been made into The Nature Discovery Centre by the Royal Society for the Protection of Birds.

References

Kennet and Avon Canal
Sites of Special Scientific Interest in Berkshire
West Berkshire District
Local Nature Reserves in Berkshire
Tourist attractions in Berkshire
Protected areas of Berkshire
Thatcham
Berkshire, Buckinghamshire and Oxfordshire Wildlife Trust